Coryton House may refer to:

Coryton House, Cardiff, a historic house in Coryton, Cardiff, Wales
Coryton House, Devon, a historic house in Coryton, Devon, England